Sir Christopher Owen Hum  (born 27 January 1946) is the former UK Ambassador to the People's Republic of China and Master of a constituent college of the University of Cambridge.

Education
Hum was educated at Berkhamsted School, a boarding independent school for boys in Berkhamsted in Hertfordshire, followed by Pembroke College at the University of Cambridge, where he read modern languages, and is now an Honorary Fellow.

Life and career
Hum was Her Majesty's Ambassador to the People's Republic of China from the years 2002–2006. On 16 January 2006, he became the 41st Master of Gonville and Caius College, one of the oldest colleges of the University of Cambridge, until October 2012.

Personal life
Hum is married with two children.

Offices held

External links
 Christopher Hum, "China: The Challenges of Development"

1946 births
Living people
People educated at Berkhamsted School
Alumni of Pembroke College, Cambridge
Knights Commander of the Order of St Michael and St George
Ambassadors of the United Kingdom to China
British diplomats in East Asia
British expatriates in China
Fellows of Gonville and Caius College, Cambridge
Masters of Gonville and Caius College, Cambridge
Fellows of Pembroke College, Cambridge
Ambassadors of the United Kingdom to Poland